The Top of the World is a 1920 novel by the British writer Ethel M. Dell.

Adaptation
In 1925 it was adapted into an American silent film of the same title directed by George Melford and starring Anna Q. Nilsson.

References

Bibliography
 Goble, Alan. The Complete Index to Literary Sources in Film. Walter de Gruyter, 1999.
 Vinson, James. Twentieth-Century Romance and Gothic Writers. Macmillan, 1982.

1920 British novels
Novels by Ethel M. Dell
British novels adapted into films